The Prescott Kid is a 1934 American Western film directed by David Selman, from an original screenplay by Ford Beebe, which stars Tim McCoy, Sheila Mannors, and Joseph Sauers. The picture was released on November, 1934. The screenplay was based on a short story, "Wolves of Catclaw", by Claude Rister which had appeared in the November 1933 issue of Rangeland Love Magazine.

Cast list
 Tim McCoy as Tim Hamlin
 Sheila Mannors as Dolores Ortega
 Joseph Sauers as Captain Willoughby
 Stephen Chase as Ed Walton
 Hooper Atchley as Bonner
 Albert J. Smith as Frazier
 Harry Todd as Dr. Haley
 Walter Brennan as Stage driver
 Carlos De Valdez as Don Rafael Ortega
 Ernie Adams as Red Larson
 Steve Clark as Crocker
 Tom London as Slim, henchman
 Charles King as J. Bones
 Eddie Cobb as Buck
 Jack Curtis as Bartender
 Bud Osborne as Ames
 Charles Brinley as Manuel
 Dick Botiller as Isadoro
 Joe Delacruz as Antonio

References

External links
 
 
 

1934 films
1934 Western (genre) films
Columbia Pictures films
Films directed by David Selman
American Western (genre) films
Films based on short fiction
American black-and-white films
1930s English-language films
1930s American films